Works and Days is a didactic poem written by ancient Greek poet Hesiod around 700 BC. It is in dactylic hexameter and contains 828 lines. At its center, the Works and Days is a farmer's almanac in which Hesiod instructs his brother Perses in the agricultural arts.

Scholars have seen this work against a background of agrarian crisis in mainland Greece, which inspired a wave of colonial expeditions in search of new land. In the poem, Hesiod also offers his brother extensive moralizing advice on how he should live his life. Works and Days is perhaps best known for its two mythological aetiologies for the toil and pain that define the human condition - the story of Prometheus and Pandora, and the so-called Myth of Five Ages.

Synopsis

In Works and Days, Hesiod describes himself as the heir of a farm bequeathed to his brother Perses and him.  Perses, though, apparently squandered his wealth and came back for what is owned by Hesiod. Perses went to the law and bribed the lords to judge in his favour.  The poem contains a sharp attack against unjust judges like those who decided in favour of Perses; they are depicted as pocketing bribes as they render their unfair verdicts. Hesiod seems to have thought that instead of giving him money or property, which he will again spend in no time, teaching him the virtues of work and impart his wisdom, which can be used to generate an income, would be better.

Like the Theogony, Works and Days begins with a hymnic invocation to the Muses, albeit much shorter (10 lines to the Theogony 115) and with a different focus. The poet invokes the "Pierian Muses" to sing of their father Zeus and his control of the fates of mankind. Through the power of Zeus, men might be famous or nameless; he easily strengthens and oppresses the strong, reduces the conspicuous and raises up the inconspicuous; easily he straightens the crooked and withers the many. Hesiod then appeals to Zeus to guide his undertaking: "Hearken, seeing and hearing, and through justice put straight the laws; and may I speak the truth to Perses."

Hesiod begins the poem proper by directly engaging with the content of the Theogony. There was after all not one Eris ("Strife"), as in that poem, but two: one is quite blameworthy and provokes wars and disagreement among mankind; but the other is commended by all who know her, for she compels men to work honorably, rivaling each other: 

Hesiod encourages Perses to avoid the bad Eris and not let her persuade him to frequent the arguments in the agora, but to focus on working for his livelihood. Family business follows, as Hesiod implores his brother to join him in sorting out their fraternal discord through the "justice of Zeus". It comes out that they had previously divided their patrimony, but that Perses claimed more than his fair share by influencing "bribe-devouring kings" (dōrophagoi basileis).

The following few hundred verses—by far the most famous portion of the poem—comprise a series of mythological examples and gnomic statements outlining Hesiod's conception of justice and the necessity of work, with the ostensible goal of persuading Perses to follow a proper path in life. The first lesson is about why the immortals keep an easy livelihood hidden from mankind: the story of Prometheus and Pandora is the answer. In the Theogony, Pandora and the "tribe of women" had been sent as a plague upon man in punishment for Prometheus's attempt to deceive Zeus of his deserved portion when men and gods were dividing a feast, and for his subsequent theft of fire. In the Works and Days, Hesiod proceeds directly to the theft of fire and punishment. Zeus instructed the gods to build an "evil" for mankind: that is, Pandora, whom Prometheus's brother Epimetheus accepted from Hermes despite his brother's warnings never to accept gifts from the gods. Before Pandora's arrival, man had lived free from evils, toil and illness, but she had been given a jar which contained all these curses; this she opened, releasing all its contents but Elpis ("Hope" or "Expectation").

The Myth of the Ages follows. In the Hesiodic scheme, there were five ages of mankind: the Golden Age, Silver Age, Bronze Age, Heroic Age, and the present age, that of Iron. Race of gold man lived in the time of Cronus, an age of plenty and peace, for the earth gave for all their needs of its own accord and rivalries of any kind were thus unknown. Men of the Golden Age never aged, and when they died they went as though to sleep. When this age came to an end, its population became guardians of mankind, protecting them from evils and granting them wealth. The Silver Age was much worse than the Golden, both in stature and temperament. People lived as children with their mothers for a hundred years. Once they came of age, they lived but a brief time, suffering because of their foolishness. They fought with one another and did not obey the gods. Angry at their impiety, Zeus destroyed the race; still, they are granted the honor of being called "chthonic blessed mortals". The Bronze Race was fearsome and warlike. Their weapons were bronze, they lived in bronze houses, and they wore bronze armour; black iron did not exist yet. They fell at each other's hands and came to an inglorious end. The race of heroes was more just and noble. Though demigods, they too fell in war, most notably those at Thebes and Troy. After death, they were transported to the Isles of the Blessed where they lived a postmortem life of plenty similar to the Golden Age. Hesiod then laments that he lived during the Iron Age, which is characterized by toil and hardship. He predicts that Zeus will destroy his race, too, when men are born gray-haired, and all moral and religious standards are ignored. Aidos and Nemesis will depart the earth, leaving behind ills against which there will be no bulwark.

The kings are now addressed, as Hesiod relates the fable of the nightingale and the hawk to them. A hawk flying high in the air had a nightingale in its talons. The smaller bird was shrieking and crying, to which the hawk responded:

Editions and translations

Critical editions 
 .  Link to text – Editio maior.
 . – Editio minor.
 . – With introduction and commentary (in German); omits the "Days".
 . – With introduction and commentary.
 . – With introduction and commentary.
 . – 3rd edition of Solmsen's 1970 Oxford Classical Text.

Translations 
 Chapman, George (1618). The Georgicks of Hesiod. (Reprinted as: Hesiod's Works and Days. London: Smith, 1888.)  Metrical translation.
 Cooke, Thomas (1743). The Works of Hesiod. 2nd ed. London, 1743. (Reprinted in The British Poets in 100 Volumes. Vol. 88.  London: Whittingham, 1822.) Metrical translation.
 Elton, Charles Abraham. The Remains of Hesiod. 2nd ed. London: Baldwin, 1815. Metrical translation.
 . Link to the full text of the 1914 first edition.  – English translation with introduction and facing Greek text.
 Lattimore, Richmond. (1959). Hesiod: The Works and Days, Theogony, and The Shield of Herakles. Ann Arbor: The University of Michigan Press. . Wender, Dorothy, (1976) Hesiod: Theogony /Works and Days, Theognis: Elegies, Penguin: London. With introduction by Dorothy Wender 
 .  Link to text – With introduction and notes. 
 .
 . – With introduction, notes and glossary by Robert Lamberton. 
 . 
 . – English translation with introduction and facing Greek text. 
 . – With introduction and notes. 
 . – Introductions by the translators are also included, as is an essay by Caldwell entitled “The Psychology of the Succession Myth". 
Hine, Daryl (2008), Works of Hesiod and the Homeric Hymns, University of Chicago Press . In dactylic hexameter with introduction, notes and index. 
 Johnson, Kimberly (2017), Theogony and Works and Days: A New Bilingual Edition, Northwestern University Press, .
 Stallings, A. E. (2018), Works and Days, Penguin, . Verse translation with introduction, notes and index.

Notes

References

 Works cited 
 .
 Bartlett, Robert C. "An Introduction to Hesiod's Works and Days", The Review of Politics 68 (2006), pp. 177–205, University of Notre Dame.
 Beall, E.F., What Pandora let out and what she left in, paper read at the annual meeting of the Classical Association of the Atlantic States, October 6, 2006
 .
 Clay, Jenny Strauss, Hesiod's Cosmos, Cambridge, 2003.
 Kenaan, Vered Lev, Pandora's Senses :  The Feminine Character of the Ancient Text,  Madison, Wisconsin, University of Wisconsin Press, 2008.    
 Lamberton, Robert, Hesiod, New Haven : Yale University Press, 1988. . Cf. Chapter III, The Works and Days, pp. 105–133.
 .
 Nelson, Stephanie A., God and the Land: The Metaphysics of Farming in Hesiod and Vergil, New York and Oxford, 1998
 Nisbet, Gideon, Hesiod, Works and Days: A Didaxis of Deconstruction?, Greece and Rome 51 (2004), pp. 147–63.
 Peabody, Berkley, The Winged Word: A Study in the Technique of Ancient Greek Oral Composition as Seen Principally Through Hesiod's Works and Days, State University of New York Press, 1975. 
 .
 Verdenius, Willem Jacob, A Commentary on Hesiod Works and Days vv. 1–382'' (Leiden: E.J. Brill, 1985).

External links

 Hesiod, the Homeric Hymns and Homerica, Works and Days - OMedieval and Classical Literature Library Release #8
 
 Hesiod: Works and Days, Full Text in English, 31 pages
 

8th-century BC books
7th-century BC books
8th-century BC poems
Ancient Greek poems
Iron Age Greece
Greek colonization
Hesiod
References on Greek mythology